Moussa Muryango (born 25 May 1999) is a Burundian football defender who plays for Lipuli.

References

1999 births
Living people
Sportspeople from Bujumbura
Burundian footballers
Burundi international footballers
AS Inter Star players
Vital'O F.C. players
Lipuli F.C. players
Association football defenders
Burundian expatriate footballers
Expatriate footballers in Tanzania
Burundian expatriate sportspeople in Tanzania
Tanzanian Premier League players